Lis is a village and a former municipality in the Dibër County, northern Albania. At the 2015 local government reform it became a subdivision of the municipality Mat. The population at the 2011 census was 3,824.

Demographic history
Lis (Liz) is recorded in the Ottoman defter of 1467 as a hass-ı mir-liva settlement in the vilayet of Mati. The village had a total of nine households which were represented by the following household heads: Petër Syimiri, Gjon Birjuvi, Marin Franko, Tanush Birjuvi, Gjon Gjiriki, Palko Pipi, Gjon Xhani, Nikolla Todi, and Dom Valandidi.

References

Former municipalities in Dibër County
Administrative units of Mat (municipality)
Villages in Dibër County